Willie Smith was an American baseball pitcher in the Negro leagues. Smith played with the Homestead Grays during their 1948 Negro World Series championship season.

References

External links
 and Seamheads

Homestead Grays players
Year of birth missing
Year of death missing
Baseball pitchers